The 322d Tactical Airlift Wing is an inactive unit of the United States Air Force

History
The unit was activated as the 322d Tactical Airlift Wing on 1 January 1970 at Rhein-Main Air Base West Germany, replacing the 7310th Tactical Airlift Wing.

The 322d Wing used rotational Lockheed C-130 Hercules squadrons for tactical airlift in Europe, North Africa, and the Middle East. In addition, the wing used C-118s and C-131s for aeromedical airlift until late 1972, then shifted to C-9As for this work, continuing aeromedical airlift operations through March 1975.

The wing utilized KC-135 (VIP equipped) to provide transportation for CINCUSAFE until early 1973, followed by KC-135B until early 1974 and by C-135C thereafter. Used VT-29 aircraft to support Air Force North, a North Atlantic Treaty Organization component.

In March 1973, the wing gained the 7th Special Operations Squadron, equipped with C-47, UH-1H, and C-130E aircraft, which was reassigned from the 26th Tactical Reconnaissance Wing at Ramstein Air Base when the 26th moved to Zweibrücken AB. All but the C-130s were transferred a few months later, to conduct unconventional warfare operations in Europe.

The wing was inactivated in June 1975 when it was replaced by the 435th Tactical Airlift Wing.

Lineage
 Constituted as the 322d Tactical Airlift Wing on 21 November 1969
 Activated on 1 January 1970
 Inactivated on 30 June 1975

Assignments
 Seventeenth Air Force, 1 January 1970 – 30 June 1975

Components
 Assigned
 7th Special Operations Squadron: 15 March 1973 – 30 June 1976
 55th Aeromedical Airlift Squadron: 1 January 1970 – 31 March 1975
 7406th Support Squadron (later 7406th Operations Squadron: 15 November 1971 – 30 June 1974
 7411 Support Flight (later 7411th Operations Flight: 1 February 1972 – 1 February 1975

 Attached C-130 rotation squadrons
 32d Tactical Airlift Squadron, 15 February-15 April 1975
 36th Tactical Airlift Squadron, 1 January-2 February 1970; 10 August-21 October 1970; 29 September-29 October 1971; 16 August-16 October 1974
 37th Tactical Airlift Squadron, 4 October-1 November 1970; 8 February-10 April 1971; 1 September-5 October 1972; 16 April – 25 June 1974; 15 April – 15 June 1975
 38th Tactical Airlift Squadron, 16 December 1974 – 15 February 1975
 39th Tactical Airlift Squadron, 15 December 1973 – 12 February 1974
 40th Tactical Airlift Squadron, 1 September-5 October 1971; 11 April – 5 June 1973
 41st Tactical Airlift Squadron, 12 June-11 August 1972; 11 February-13 April 1973; 11 August-12 October 1973
 47th Tactical Airlift Squadron, 18 February-18 March 1970, 16 June-10 August 1970, 8 December 1971 – 14 February 1972, 11 August-20 October 1972, and 16 December 1972 – 11 February 1973
 48th Tactical Airlift Squadron, 12 April – 11 June 1972 and 20 October-16 December 1972
 50th Tactical Airlift Squadron, 1 June-15 August 1974
 61st Tactical Airlift Squadron, 21 October-19 December 1970, 5 June-11 August 1973, 16 October-16 December 1974, 15–30 June 1975
 62d Tactical Airlift Squadron, 10 April – 12 June 1971
 347th Tactical Airlift Squadron, 2 February-13 April 1970, 12 June-12 August 1971, and 14 February-17 April 1972
 348th Tactical Airlift Squadron, 5 October-8 December 1971
 772d Tactical Airlift Squadron, 12 February-16 April 1974
 774th Tactical Airlift Squadron, 12 October-15 December 1973
 778th Tactical Airlift Squadron, 12 August-1 September 1971
 779th Tactical Airlift Squadron, 13 April – 16 June 1970 and 19 December 1970 – 7 February 1971

Bases assigned
 Rhein-Main Air Base, West Germany 1 January 1970 – 30 June 1975

Aircraft
C-130 (1970–1975)
VC-131 (1973–1974)
UH-1 (1973)
C-9 (1972–1975)
C-135 (1972–1974)
VC-118 (1971–1972)
C-131 (1970–1975)
VT-29 (1970–1975)
VC-54 (1970)
C-47 Skytrain (1970–1972)
KC-135 (1970–1974)
C-118 (1970–1972)

See also
 List of inactive AFCON wings of the United States Air Force
 List of Lockheed C-130 Hercules operators
 List of United States Air Force airlift squadrons

References

Notes
 Explanatory notes

 Citations

Bibliography

 

Military units and formations established in 1970
0322